The Philadelphia Barrage played their sixth season, as a charter member of the MLL (originally known as the Bridgeport Barrage), during the 2006 season of Major League Lacrosse. The Barrage won their 1st Eastern Conference Championship during the regular season with a 1st place record of 10-2.  The Barrage qualified for the MLL Playoffs for the second time in franchise history.  The Barrage defeated the Cannons 17-12 in the MLL Semifinals at The Home Depot Center on August 25, 2006.  The Barrage won their 2nd MLL Championship by defeating the Outlaws 23-12 in the MLL Championship Game at The Home Depot Center on August 27, 2006.

Schedule

Playoffs

Major League Lacrosse seasons
Philadelphia Barrage Season, 2006
Philadelphia Barrage
Lacrosse in Pennsylvania
2006 in Philadelphia